Kim Joo-hyun or Kim Ju-hyeon may refer to:

Kim Joo-hyun (actress)
Kim Joo-hyun (government official)
Kim Ju-hyeon (speed skater)